Orcop is a village and civil parish in the county of Herefordshire, England.

It has a well-preserved early Norman motte-and-bailey castle and a church dedicated to St. John the Baptist which has a chancel built around 1300, and a tower that was added early in the 16th century.  The larger village of Orcop Hill is nearby.

Attractions and amenities

St John The Baptist Church 
A church with part of the build dating back to the 12th Century with a timber-framed Bell tower constructed in the 16th Century.  There are heavy timbers supporting inside, and weatherboarding on the tower without.  The narrow aisle with arcade is early 13th century, with a later 13th-century chancel window; and the piscina or font is Norman.  A south door is 14th century.  And the nave had a wagon roof.  In 19th century Thomas Nicholson, architect renovated the windows in the polygonal vestry and elsewhere in the church. Many of the church's original features were removed during a Victorian renovation.  Known as 'the Poets Church' due to being the site where Frances Horovitz was laid to rest.

The Fountain Inn 
A typical country pub, compact in size with an open fire. Closed in 2012 so the current owners could try to get planning permission to convert the pub into a residential dwelling, this application was rejected due to lack of supporting evidence for claims the business was not viable or needed in the community or that the Inn had been promoted in any way to aid its success. On 5 September 2014 Planning was once again submitted for the same conversion, but for a 'Redundant Public House'. This planning was also rejected  on the grounds that the business had shown no evidence that it is not viable in the area and also that there is insufficient evidence to suggest the building serves no purpose to the community. The pub reopened under new owners in December 2016.

Orcop Village Hall 
A village hall which remains in use regularly by the Parish Council, Age Concern as well as offering keep fit classes and being used for fundraising and Family events. The hall also has a large car park, outdoor sports area and a capacity of 160 seats.

Farming and agriculture 
Orcop is a village surrounded by working farms. Dairy, Sheep, Arable and Free Range Eggs. As a result, visitors can get a taste of real country life simply by driving by and seeing the fields in use and machinery on the go. Visitors and Locals can also be seen purchasing goods such as Eggs and Plants from the Drives of properties with honesty boxes. Something which demonstrates the Friendly atmosphere you can find.

Walking 
Footpaths surround Orcop, they wind up the hills into the neighbouring areas of Garway and St Weonards.

Shops 
Orcop has no village stores, the only shop is a Canoe & Kayak Centre which is a Farm Diversification. as part of this diversification a Lake was built on the Farmland and a Campsite  has been Formed around this feature.

The Nearest shops servicing the residents of Orcop are St Weonards Village Stores and Post Office, along with Pontrilas Post Office and Ewyas Harold Village Stores which are in the opposite direction. The City of Hereford is approximately 10.6 Miles Away

References

Villages in Herefordshire